Senate elections were held in Turkey on 5 June 1966. In this election 52 members of the senate were elected; 50 members for one-third of the senate and two vacant seats.

Results

References

Turkey
Turkey
Senate
Senate elections in Turkey